The Great Macarthy is a 1975 comedy about Australian rules football. It was an adaptation of the 1970 novel A Salute to the Great McCarthy by Barry Oakley. It stars John Jarratt as the title character (in his film debut) as a local footballer playing for Kyneton, who is signed up (or more appropriately, kidnapped) by the South Melbourne Football Club (now Sydney Swans). It also stars Barry Humphries and Judy Morris. It was released at a time of resurgence in Australian cinema but was not very successful despite its high-profile cast.

Plot
Macarthy is a country football player who is kidnapped by the South Melbourne Football Club and made a star player in the city. The Club Chairman, Colonel Ball-Miller, gives Macarthy a job in one of his companies and makes him attend night school. He is seduced by his English teacher, Miss Russell, and has an affair with Ball-Miller's daughter, Andrea.

Macarthy and Andrea get married but then divorce. Macarthy goes on strike to claim the family fortune.

Cast
John Jarratt as MacArthy
Judy Morris as Miss Russell
Kate Fitzpatrick as Andrea
Sandy Macgregor as Vera
Barry Humphries as Colonel Ball-Miller
John Frawley as Webster
Colin Croft as Tranter
Chris Haywood as Warburton
Colin Drake as Ackerman
Ron Frazer as Twentyman
Max Gillies as Stan
Dennis Miller as MacGuinness
Lou Richards as Lou Arnold
Jack Dyer as Jack Diehard
Jim Bowles as Les
Bruce Spence as Bill Dean
Peter Cummins as Rerk

Production
David Baker was an emerging director who was interested in Barry Oakley's novel. Richard Brennan optioned it for him and they agreed to make the film together, hiring playwright John Romeril to do the adaptation. According to Brennan, Romeril's second draft was "fantastic" but later drafts included too much sex and slapstick to make it more like other successful Australian films at the time such as The Adventures of Barry McKenzie and Alvin Purple.

Philip Adams later claimed he always knew the film would struggle "because of its idiosyncratic and complex nature".

The film was shot in mid 1974. Half the budget was provided by the Australian Film Development Corporation.

Release
The film performed poorly critically and at the box office.

References

External links

The Great Macarthy at the National Film and Sound Archive
The Great Macarthy at Oz Movies

1975 films
1970s sports comedy films
Films based on Australian novels
Australian rules football films
Australian sports comedy films
Films scored by Bruce Smeaton
Australian slapstick films
1975 comedy films
1970s English-language films
Films directed by David Baker